The 1982 Lilian Cup was the 1st season of the competition. The four top placed teams for the previous season took part in the competition.

The competition was held in two stages. First, the four teams played a round-robin tournament, after which the two top teams played for the cup, while the bottom teams played for the third place. The competition was held between 4 September and 15 September 1982. This was the first league competition in Israel to award three points for a victory.

The competition was won by Maccabi Netanya, who had beaten Hapoel Be'er Sheva 3–1 in the final.

Group stage
The matches were played from 4 September to 11 November 1982.

Final stage

3rd-4th Place Match

Final

References

Lilian 1982
Lilian Cup